The Education of Fairies is a 2006 internationally co-produced drama film directed by José Luis Cuerda. It is a co-production by companies from Spain, France, Argentina, and Portugal (Tornasol Films, Finales Felices, Messidor Films, Lazennec, Pol-Ka Producciones, Madragoa Filmes). It is primarily shot in Spanish, with some dialogue in French.

Cast

See also 
 List of Spanish films of 2006
 List of Argentine films of 2007

References

External links 

The Education of Fairies on Cineuropa

2006 drama films
Spanish drama films
French drama films
Argentine drama films
Portuguese drama films
2000s Spanish-language films
2006 films
2000s Spanish films
2000s French films
2000s Argentine films
Tornasol Films films
Films directed by José Luis Cuerda